Porfirio Díaz is a 1944 Mexican historical film directed by Rafael M. Saavedra and Raphael J. Sevilla. It portrays the life of the nineteenth century Mexican soldier and President Porfirio Díaz.

Cast
 Emilio Brillas 
 Asunción Casal 
 Fernando Curiel 
 Mimí Derba
 Tony Díaz
 Gloria Estrada
 Conchita Gentil Arcos 
 José Goula 
 Rafael Icardo
 Miguel Inclán 
 José Luis Jiménez 
 Max Langler
 Chel López 
 José Elías Moreno 
 Manuel Noriega 
 Alicia de Phillips 
 Salvador Quiroz 
 Humberto Rodríguez 
 Virginia Serret 
 David Silva   
 Arturo Soto Rangel    
 Dolores Tinoco   
 David Valle González
 Aurora Zermeño

References

Bibliography 
 Turner, Frederick. The Dynamic of Mexican Nationalism. University of North Carolina Press, 1968.

External links 
 

1944 films
1940s biographical films
1940s historical films
Mexican biographical films
Mexican historical films
1940s Spanish-language films
Films set in the 19th century
Films directed by Raphael J. Sevilla
Biographical films about presidents
Cultural depictions of Porfirio Díaz

Mexican black-and-white films
1940s Mexican films